Animal testing is the use of non-human animals in experiments that seek to control the variables that affect the behavior or biological system under study.

Animal testing may also refer to:
Alternatives to animal testing
Animal testing on invertebrates
Animal testing on non-human primates
Animal testing on rodents
Animal testing regulations
History of animal testing
Testing cosmetics on animals